Kyllene, also known as Ascanius Portus, was a port town of ancient Aeolis. 

Its site is tentatively located near Yenifoça, Asiatic Turkey.

References

Populated places in ancient Aeolis
Former populated places in Turkey